The 181st Division was created in February 1949 under the Regulation of the Redesignations of All Organizations and Units of the Army, issued by Central Military Commission on November 1, 1948, basing on the 37th Brigade, 13th Column of the Huabei Military Region Field Force. Its history could be traced to the Independent Anti-Japanese Detachment of the Eighth Route Army in Western Anhui, activated in September 1944.

During the Sino-Japanese War and the Chinese Civil War, the unit was made famous for its commander, Pi Dingjun() and obtained the nickname of "Pi's Brigade"(). It was the only unit that was combat effective after the obliteration of the Central Plains Liberated Area in late 1945.

The division was part of 61st Corps. Under the flag of the 181st division, it took part in many major battles in the Chinese Civil War, including the Menglianggu Campaign, Linfen Campaign, Jinzhong Campaign, and Taiyuan Campaign.

The division was composed of the 541st, 542nd, and 543rd regiments as of its formation.

In November 1950, the division was transferred to 60th Corps's control following the 61st Corps' disbandment.

In March 1951, the division was deployed into Korea as a part of the People's Volunteer Army along with the 60th Corps.

In September 1953, the division left Korea. During its deployment, it allegedly inflicted 16,754 casualties on the confronting UN Forces.

The division was then garrisoned in Chu County, Anhui Province.

In November 1953, the 587th Artillery Regiment was activated and attached to the division.

In February 1955, the 283rd Tank Self-Propelled Artillery Regiment was attached to the division from the 78th Infantry Division, now reconstituted into a coastal defense unit.

From April 1960, the division was renamed as the 181st Army Division() and became a showcase unit for foreign delegations.  By then the division was composed of:
541st Regiment
542nd Regiment
543rd Regiment
587th Artillery Regiment
283rd Tank Self-Propelled Artillery Regiment

In February 1961, the 283rd Tank Self-Propelled Artillery Regiment detached from the division to join the 179th Army Division.

In December 1964, 538th Regiment was attached to the division from the disbanding 180th Army Division.

From May 1967 to January 1968, Anti-Aircraft Artillery Battalion, 181st Army Division was deployed to the North Vietnam to defend against US air campaigns. The battalion participated in 12 engagements with no alleged kills.

In July 1967, 538th Regiment detached from the division to join the newly activated 178th Army Division.

In February, 105th Regiment was attached to the division.

In August 1969, 587th Artillery Regiment was renamed the Artillery Regiment, Army 181st Division.

On October 10, 1969, 105th Regiment detached from the division to join the 1st Independent Division of Jiangsu Provincial Military District.

On December 8, 1969, the division was redesignated as the 180th Army Division(). All its regiments were then redesignated:
541st Regiment was redesignated as the 538th Regiment;
542nd Regiment was redesignated as the 539th Regiment;
543rd Regiment was redesignated as the 540th Regiment.

In January 1985, the division was redesignated as the 181st Army Division(). All its regiments were then redesignated:
538th Regiment was redesignated as the 541st Regiment;
539th Regiment was redesignated as the 542nd Regiment;
540th Regiment was redesignated as the 543rd Regiment.

In September 1985, the division was redesignated as the 181st Infantry Division() and reconstituted as a northern infantry division, category B. The division was transferred to the 1st Army following 60th Army Corps' disbandment.

The division was then composed of:
541st Infantry Regiment
542nd Infantry Regiment
543rd Infantry Regiment
Artillery Regiment

In 1996 the division was transferred to the People's Armed Police' control and reconstituted as the 181st Armed Police Mobile Division(). The division was then composed of:
541st Armed Police Regiment
542nd Armed Police Regiment
543rd Armed Police Regiment
711th Armed Police Regiment

In 2017, the division was deactivated along with other PAP mobile divisions.

References
中国人民解放军各步兵师沿革, http://blog.sina.com.cn/s/blog_a3f74a990101cp1q.html

Infantry divisions of the People's Volunteer Army
181
Military units and formations established in 1949
Military units and formations disestablished in 2017